Athletic Club Sparta Praha, commonly known as Sparta Prague and Sparta Praha, is a football club based in Prague.

It is the most successful club in the Czech Republic and one of the most successful in central Europe, winning the central European Cup (also known as the Mitropa Cup) three times as well as having reached the semi-finals of the European Cup (now the UEFA Champions League) in 1992 and the UEFA Cup Winners' Cup in 1973.

Sparta have won a record 36 domestic league titles, the Czech Cup (formerly Czechoslovak Cup) 27 times, also a record, and the Czech Supercup twice. Sparta was long the main source for the Czech Republic national football team, however lately this has ceased to be the case, as the best Czech players almost exclusively play in foreign leagues.

Sparta play at Prague's Epet Arena, also known as Letná Stadium.

History

Early years
At the close of 1893, a small group of young people based around three brothers – Václav, Bohumil and Rudolf Rudl – had the idea of setting up a sports club. On 16 November, the founders' meeting approved the club's articles of association and one month later, on 17 December, the first annual general meeting took place. Soon after that, the Athletic Club Sparta came up with its tricolour, in which blue symbolises Europe, red and yellow being the symbols of the (then) Royal City of Prague.

At the very beginning of the club's football history, the players used to wear black jerseys with a big "S" on the front. They then played for two years in black-and-white striped jerseys, which they returned to, wearing them as a reserve strip, for two years in 1996. In 1906, club president Dr. Petřík was in England where he saw the famous Woolwich Arsenal play with their red jerseys and decided to bring one set to Prague. At that time, he did not realise he was setting up one of the club's greatest traditions. Together with the red jerseys, Sparta players wear white shorts and black socks.

Shortly after World War I, a team was put together that triggered off the famous period of the 1920s and '30s referred to as "Iron Sparta". A football league in Czechoslovakia was established in the mid-twenties and the club collected title after title. To this day, the fans still recall the names of the players of that period with admiration: Peyer, Hojer, Perner, Káďa, Kolenatý, Červený. A few years later, some no less famous names appeared, such as Hochmann, Burgr, Hajný, Šíma, Silný, Čtyřoký, Košťálek and in particular Oldřich Nejedlý, the top scorer at the 1934 FIFA World Cup. Shortly before this most famous era kicked off, Vlasta Burian, the man who later became the king of Czech comedians, played in goal for the club.

The milestones of the first golden period of the club's history are two Central European Cup titles, which in the '20 and the '30s enjoyed the same recognition as that of today's Champions League. Sparta's three titles are important milestones in the cup's history. After two triumphs in 1927 and 1935, the third came in 1964, at a time when the cup's importance was gradually falling behind that of other European cups.

In 1946, AC Sparta toured Great Britain opening with a 2–2 draw against Arsenal on 2 October.

Golden years
Golden periods alternated with years when Sparta fans only nostalgically remembered the "good old times". After substantial changes driven by the socialist regime, bringing frequent changes of the club's name rather than achievements to be proud of, the title in 1954 was the last one before a long period of misery. Only the great era of the team around Andrej Kvašňák in the 1960s brought back memories of the club's golden years.

There are still many people who recollect the era of Andrej Kvašňák, Jiří Tichý and Václav Mašek. Those were the days when Sparta hosted the biggest number of fans in its history, with the stadium at that time accommodating almost 40,000. All three of the above-mentioned heroes were part of the national team that finished second at the 1962 World Cup in Chile. Other important players in these "golden years" were Josef Vojta, Vladimír Táborský and Ivan Mráz.

Relegation and comeback
Up until 1975, Sparta was the only Czech club that had never been relegated to the second division. In this year, however, due to a number of circumstances, the team dropped to division two. The club only spent one year in this division, with the crucial matches for the club's comeback to the elite being sold out.

Nevertheless, the club did not win another league title until the early 1980s. Built around Chovanec, Berger, Hašek, Skuhravý and Griga, the team regained its former status and won five league titles in a row between 1986 and 1991. In 1983–84, the team got as far as the UEFA Cup quarter-finals, falling to Hajduk Split. In the early 1990s, this successful era was continued by the next generation of players, such as Siegl, Horňák, Němeček, Frýdek, Němec and Kouba.

1990s to present
Sparta has achieved a number of international successes, including two Central European Cup titles in the period of "Iron Sparta". More recent high points include Sparta's performance in the first year of the UEFA Champions League, in 1991–92. Sparta defeated Rangers, then Marseille and reached the semi-final group. Playing Barcelona, Dynamo Kyiv and Benfica, Sparta finished second. Unlike today's system, only the group winner reached the final. Being second in the group, Sparta was unofficially Europe's third or fourth best team.

Sparta participated in the group stage of Champions League between 1997 and 2006. The club enjoyed their best Champions League performances in the 1999–2000 and 2001–02 seasons, reaching the now-defunct second group stage on both occasions. In 1999–2000, it won its initial group under the management of Ivan Hašek, and was then third in the quarter-final group. In that group, Sparta came up against a Barcelona squad which went on to reach the semi-finals.

In the 2001–02 season, Sparta was drawn against the eventual winners of both the European competitions during the course of its run. Feyenoord lost twice to Sparta in the champions league group stage and managed to qualify for the UEFA Cup, which it went on to win. Sparta went on to meet Real Madrid in the quarter-final that year. Sparta did not qualify for the group stage in 2002–03, when it was beaten by the Belgian club Genk in the third round of qualifying. 2003–04 saw Sparta take on two Italian giants; initially, the club beat Lazio in the group stage, but after an initial draw Sparta failed to get into the quarter-finals past Milan. The group stage in 2004–05 did not work out at all well for Sparta. After drawing with Manchester United at the sold-out Toyota Arena, the other matches were lost and the club finished last in the group with the club achieving their worst-ever return of just one point from the six matches.

 1997–98 – 3rd place in the group stage (Borussia Dortmund, Parma, Galatasaray)
 1998–99 – knocked-out in the qualification round by Dynamo Kyiv
 1999–00 – 1st place in the group stage (Bordeaux, Willem II, Spartak Moscow), 3rd place in the second round group (Barcelona, Porto, Hertha BSC)
 2000–01 – 4th place in the group stage (Arsenal, Lazio, Shakhtar Donetsk)
 2001–02 – 2nd place in the group stage (Bayern Munich, Feyenoord, Spartak Moscow), 3rd place in the second round group (Real Madrid, Panathinaikos, Porto)
 2002–03 – knocked-out in the 3rd qualification round by Genk
 2003–04 – 2nd place in the group stage (Chelsea, Lazio, Beşiktaş), knocked-out in the eight-finals by Milan
 2004–05 – 4th place in the group stage (Manchester United, Lyon, Fenerbahçe)
 2005–06 – 4th place in the group stage (Arsenal, Ajax, Thun)
 2007–08 – knocked-out in the 3rd qualification round by Arsenal
 2008–09 – knocked-out in the 3rd qualification round by Panathinaikos
 2009–10 – knocked-out in the 3rd qualification round by Panathinaikos
 2010–11 – knocked-out in the play-off round by Žilina
 2014–15 – knocked-out in the 3rd qualification round by Malmö FF
 2015–16 – knocked-out in the 3rd qualification round by CSKA Moscow
 2016–17 – knocked-out in the 3rd qualification round by Steaua București
 2017–18 – knocked-out in the 3rd qualification round by Red Star Belgrade
 2018–19 – knocked-out in the 2nd qualification round by Spartak Subotica

Sparta, usually along with Slavia, has always been a base for the national team; Sparta players contributed to the biggest achievements of the Czechoslovak and Czech national teams. It all started in 1934, when Oldřich Nejedlý was the top scorer at the World Cup in Rome; four years later, seven Sparta players were part of the national team at the World Cup in France. In 1962, Kvašňák and Tichý played for the "silver" team in Chile. In 1990 in Italy, where the national team got as far as the quarterfinal, the team's play was mainly created by Chovanec, Bílek, Hašek and other Sparta players, such as Skuhravý, who went on to become a star of the Italian league. Sparta players also contributed to the last big achievement of the already independent Czech Republic team in 1996. Kouba, Frýdek and Horňák returned to Letná from England with silver medals. On top of that, the team was coached by Dušan Uhrin, who had spent his best years at Sparta, and Pavel Novotný came to Sparta two years later. Sparta players also featured in more recent qualification and tournament games of the Czech national team. Miroslav Baranek, Tomáš Votava, Vratislav Lokvenc, Milan Fukal, Martin Hašek, Libor Sionko, Jiří Novotný, Jaromír Blažek and the outstanding talent of Tomáš Rosický helped the team in its UEFA Euro 2000 campaign in Belgium and the Netherlands.

The next era culminating in the bronze medal in the Euro 2004 in Portugal saw Sparta players leaving their unmistakable mark in the national team successes. Zdeněk Grygera, Tomáš Hübschman, Jaromír Blažek, Karel Poborský and academy products Petr Čech and Tomáš Rosický helped Czech football to become recognised as being amongst the elite in Europe and most have played for elite European clubs. Currently, Sparta is one of only two teams in the domestic league which supplies players to the national side. It goes without saying that the club also supplies players to the country's various youth teams.

Historical names:
 1893 — Athletic Club Královské Vinohrady
 1894 — Athletic Club Sparta
 1948 — Athletic Club Sparta Bubeneč
 1949 — Sokol Bratrství Sparta
 1951 — Sparta ČKD Sokolovo
 1953 — TJ Spartak Praha Sokolovo
 1965 — TJ Sparta ČKD Praha
 1990 — TJ Sparta Praha
 1991 — AC Sparta Praha
 1993 — AC Sparta Praha fotbal, a.s.

Club symbols

The name Sparta was inspired by the fighting spirit and courage of the people from the ancient city of Sparta. From the very beginning, the colours of Sparta were blue (symbolizing speed, athletics and sport in general), red and yellow (the official colours of Royal City of Prague). In 1906, one of the members of the committee brought (from his trip to England) jerseys of the London club Arsenal. From that time, Sparta has typically played in their red (or, to be more precise, dark red or maroon) colours.

Another symbol of Sparta is the big "S"; thus, Sparta and Slavia Prague are usually collectively called the Prague "S" and contest the Prague derby. Sparta Prague has three stars above its crest to signify winning 30–39 national league championships, adding a new star for every ten league titles.

The Czech films Why?, Up and Down and Non Plus Ultras take the culture of Sparta fandom as one of their subjects.

Supporters
The supporters of Sparta Prague are called Letenští, meaning "From Letná". They sit in the sectors D33-D36, which is behind the goal in the southern stand. The fans have good relations with those of FC Nitra and the now defunct FC VSS Košice in Slovakia.

Stadium

Sparta play their home matches at epet ARENA in the Letná district of Prague. For training Sparta use a football centre at Strahov Stadium (formerly the second largest stadium in the world) whose space was rebuilt to eight football pitches (six fields of standard sizes and two futsal-sized). These are currently used as a training facility by both youth academy and reserve squad.

Players

Current squad

Out on loan

Other players under contract

Reserve squad

Women's section

Notable former players

Player records in the Czech First League
.
Highlighted players are in the current squad.

Most appearances

Most goals

Most clean sheets

Coaches

Karel Maleček (1907–11)
František Malý (1911–18)
Johny Dick (1919–23)
Václav Špindler (1924–27)
Johny Dick (1928–33)
František Sedlaczek (1933–38)
Josef Kuchynka (1939–44)
František Sedlaczek (1945–47)
Erich Srbek (1948–53, 1957–58)
Vlastimil Preis
Karel Senecký
Jiří Šimonek
Karel Kolský (1959–63)
Jaroslav Štumpf
Václav Ježek (1964–69)
Milan Navara
Karel Kolský (1970–71)
Tadeusz Kraus (1971–74)
Ivan Mráz
Zdeněk Roček
Štefan Čambal (1975–76)
Zdeněk Roček (1976)
Dušan Uhrin (1976)
Arnošt Hložek (1977–78)
Antonín Rýgr (1978)
Jiří Rubáš (1978–81)
Dušan Uhrin (1981–82)
Václav Ježek (1982–84)
Vladimír Táborský (1984–85)
Ján Zachar (1985–86)
Václav Ježek (1986–88)
Jozef Jarabinský (1988–90)
Václav Ježek (1990–91)
Dušan Uhrin (1991–93)
Karol Dobiáš (1993–94)
Jozef Chovanec (1994)
Vladimír Borovička (1994)
Jürgen Sundermann (October 1994 – March 1995)
Jozef Jarabinský (March 1995 – December 1995)
Vlastimil Petržela (1996)
Jozef Chovanec (August 1996 – June 1998)
Zdeněk Ščasný (July 1998 – June 1999)
Ivan Hašek (July 1999 – June 2001)
Jaroslav Hřebík (2001–02)
Vítězslav Lavička (April–June 2002)
Jozef Jarabinský (July–December 2002)
Jiří Kotrba (February 2003 – March 2004)
František Straka (March 2004 – December 2004)
Jaroslav Hřebík (December 2004 – December 2005)
Stanislav Griga (December 2005 – August 2006)
Michal Bílek (September 2006 – June 2008)
Jozef Chovanec (June – July 2008)
Vítězslav Lavička (July – October 2008)
Jozef Chovanec (October 2008 – December 2011)
Martin Hašek (December 2011 – May 2012)
Vítězslav Lavička (July 2012 – April 2015)
Zdeněk Ščasný (April 2015 – September 2016)
David Holoubek (September 2016 – December 2016)
Tomáš Požár (December 2016 – March 2017)
Petr Rada (March 2017 – May 2017)
Andrea Stramaccioni (May 2017 – March 2018)
Pavel Hapal (March 2018 – July 2018)
Zdeněk Ščasný (August 2018 – April 2019)
Michal Horňák (April 2019 – June 2019)
Václav Jílek (June 2019 – February 2020)
Václav Kotal (February 2020 – February 2021)
Pavel Vrba (February 2021 – May 2022)
Michal Horňák (May 2022)
Brian Priske (June 2022 – present)

Current technical staff

European statistics

The following is a list of the all-time statistics from Sparta's games in the three UEFA tournaments it has participated in, as well as the overall total. The list contains the tournament, the number of games played (Pld), won (W), drawn (D) and lost (L). The statistics include qualification matches.
As of 24 February 2022

UEFA club coefficient ranking
As of 12 February 2021, Source:

Honours

Domestic
Czechoslovak First League / Czech First League:
Champions (33): 1925–26, 1926–27, 1931–32, 1935–36, 1937–38, 1938–39, 1943–44, 1945–46, 1947–48, 1952, 1954, 1964–65, 1966–67, 1983–84, 1984–85, 1986–87, 1987–88, 1988–89, 1989–90, 1990–91, 1992–93, 1993–94, 1994–95, 1996–97, 1997–98, 1998–99, 1999–2000, 2000–01, 2002–03, 2004–05, 2006–07, 2009–10, 2013–14

Czechoslovak Cup/Czech Cup:
Winners (15): 1963–64, 1971–72, 1975–76, 1979–80, 1983–84, 1987–88, 1988–89, 1991–92, 1995–96, 2003–04, 2005–06, 2006–07, 2007–08, 2013–14, 2019–20

Czech Supercup:
Winners (2): 2010, 2014

Continental
UEFA Champions League / European Cup:
Semi-Final (1): 1991–92
UEFA Cup Winners' Cup:
Semi Final (1): 1972–73
Mitropa Cup (Central European Cup):
Winners (3): 1927, 1935, 1964

Worldwide 
Small Club World Cup (Pequeña Copa del Mundo de Clubes):
 Winners (1): 1969

Club records
Biggest home win: Sparta Prague 12–0 Galatasaray SK (1921–22)

Czech First League records
Best position: 1st (see Honours)
Worst position: 5th (2005–06, 2017–18)
Biggest home win: Sparta 7–0 České Budějovice (1999–2000)
Biggest away win: Žižkov 1–6 Sparta (1998–99), Hradec Králové 0–5 Sparta (2001–02), Most 0–5 Sparta (2007–08), Brno 0–5 Sparta (2010–11)
Biggest home defeat: Sparta 0–3 Jablonec (2006–07), Sparta 1–4 Slavia (2008–09), Sparta 0–3 Liberec (2011–12), Sparta 0–3 Mladá Boleslav (2011–12), Sparta 0–3 Plzeň (2015–16), Sparta 0–3 Slavia (2019–20)
Biggest away defeat: Plzeň 4–0 Sparta (2018–19), Slovácko 4–0 Sparta (2021–22)

Notes

References

External links

 Official website
 AC Sparta Prague at UEFA

 
Football clubs in the Czech Republic
Association football clubs established in 1893
Prague, Sparta
Prague, Sparta
Multi-sport clubs in the Czech Republic
1893 establishments in Austria-Hungary
19th-century establishments in Bohemia
Prague, Sparta
Sparta
Football clubs in Austria-Hungary